Aer was a young indie US band consisting of David von Mering and Carter Schultz. The duo hail from Wayland, Massachusetts, a small town in the suburbs west of Boston. They first gained popularity with their debut studio album, The Bright Side in 2012, which reached #85 on the US Billboard 200. Their self-titled second album, Aer (2014), reached #26 a year and a half later. The album One Of A Kind was released on August 14, 2015.

Early career
Von Mering, who was born in Portland, Oregon and first grew up in Davis, California met Schultz in elementary school in their hometown of Wayland, Massachusetts. After their first band broke up in junior year of high school they created their own brand of music. Their mixtape Water On The Moon came out in 2010, followed by the mixtape The Reach in May 2011 followed by their EP, What You Need, later that year.

After graduating from Wayland High School the two moved to Boston and began to work full-time on their first full-length album The Bright Side, which they released in the summer of 2012. The album reached #85 on the Billboard 200. It was followed by the Strangers EP in 2013. The duo released their self-titled second album on January 21, 2014. The album reached #26 on the Billboard Chart.

Their next album One of a Kind was released on August 15, 2015. Among the first stops on the One Of A Kind Tour were the State Theater in Portland, Maine, Best Buy Theater in New York City, and the House of Blues in Boston. The Dutch band Chef'Special and Australian singer Cody Simpson were the openers. They also performed with Slightly Stoopid. Their song Floats My Boat  reached over 7 million views on YouTube.

End of Aer 2016
Schultz and Von Mering announced on social media that Aer would no longer be creating new music or performing together, adding that it was a mutual decision with no hard feelings between the two. Both have since started different lives with Schultz and von Mering still working on music but separately. von Mering also has been seen creating art pieces from his Twitter.

Discography

Albums

References

American hip hop groups
Musicians from Massachusetts